The World Junior Wrestling Championships (U20) is the main wrestling championships in the junior age category (between 18 and 20 years old), organised by United World Wrestling. This event took place twice in 1979 and 1980.

Summary 

LL : Freestyle / GR : Greco-Roman / LF : Women's Freestyle

See also
 List of Cadet, Junior and U-23 World Champions in men's freestyle wrestling
 List of Cadet, Junior and U-23 World Champions in men's Greco-Roman wrestling
 World Wrestling Championships

References

External links
 UWW

Wrestling competitions
Wrestling
Recurring sporting events established in 1969
 
Wrestling